Pterophyllini is a tribe of true katydids in the family Tettigoniidae. There are about 16 genera and more than 40 described species in Pterophyllini.

Genera
These 16 genera belong to the tribe Pterophyllini:

 Caloxiphus Saussure & Pictet, 1898
 Caribophyllum Rehn, 1947
 Diophanes Stål, 1875
 Elytraspis Beier, 1962
 Karukerana Bonfils, 1965
 Lea Caudell, 1906
 Lophaspis Redtenbacher, 1895
 Mastophyllum Beier, 1960
 Paracyrtophyllus Caudell, 1906 (western true katydids)
 Parascopioricus Beier, 1960
 Phyllopectis Rehn, 1948
 Pterophylla Kirby, 1825
 Scopioricus Uvarov, 1940
 Scopiorinus Beier, 1960
 Thliboscelus Serville, 1838
 Xestoptera Redtenbacher, 1895

References

Further reading

 
 

Pseudophyllinae